Ampelasia is a genus of moths of the family Noctuidae. The genus was described by Schaus in 1913.

Species
Ampelasia azelinoides Schaus, 1913
Ampelasia schausialis Dognin, 1914

References

Catocalinae
Noctuoidea genera